Flight 185 may refer to:

SilkAir Flight 185, crashed in 1997
Air Tahoma Flight 185, crashed in 2004

0185